Empress Wu (died September or October 245), personal name Wu Xian, formally known as Empress Mu (literally "the Just Empress"), was an empress of the state of Shu Han during the Three Kingdoms period. She was the last wife and the only empress of Liu Bei, the founding emperor of Shu Han, and a younger sister of Wu Yi.

Life 
Lady Wu was from Chenliu Commandery (陳留郡), which is around present-day Kaifeng, Henan. She was born sometime in the late Eastern Han dynasty. She had an elder brother, Wu Yi (吴懿). The siblings lost their father at a young age. However her father, whose name is not recorded in history, was a friend of Liu Yan, and therefore Lady Wu followed Liu Yan into Yi Province (covering present-day Sichuan and Chongqing) when Liu Yan was made the governor. Liu Yan had imperial ambition and knew that a physiognomist once assessed that she would rise to high nobility. Because of this and due to the friendship between her father and Liu Yan, she was married to Liu Yan's son Liu Mao who accompanied him. After Liu Mao's death, she did not remarry.

When Liu Bei seized Yi Province from Lady Wu's brother-in-law Liu Zhang in 214, he had been effectively divorced from his wife Lady Sun, the younger sister of Sun Quan. Many of Liu Bei's subordinates encouraged him to take Lady Wu as his wife. However, he was hesitant due to the fact that Liu Mao and him were of the same clan. In order to convince Liu Bei, Fa Zheng reminded Liu that Duke Wen of Jin was betrothed to Huai Ying, even though he was the brother of her previous husband, Duke Huai of Jin. Therefore, Liu Bei agreed and he married Lady Wu.

Xi Zuochi disapproved of Liu Bei's decision; he commented: "Human relations begin with the marriage between two individuals, It is the socle of a ruler's influence. The common people must abide to the ancestral customs, even more for someone who wishes to act as their ruler. Duke Wen of Jin abolished those customs and used his personal power to serve his career. Therefore, Hu Yan rightfully chastised him. This was not without reason for he violated the common rule. In Liu Bei's situation, he wasn't forced to be so quick in his decision, yet his subordinate by mentioning a previous fault as an example didn't serve his ruler the way ancient customs teach us. And Liu Bei, in following his advice, made a mistake."

When he claimed for himself the title of the "Prince of Hanzhong" in 219, he made Lady Wu his queen consort. After the fall of the Eastern Han dynasty in late 220 (with Emperor Xian's abdication to Cao Pi), Liu Bei claimed for himself the Han imperial title in 221, establishing Shu. Later that year, he made her empress. After his death in 223, his son and successor Liu Shan honoured her as empress dowager. She died in 245 and was buried at Huiling along with Liu Bei in the imperial tomb. However the Records of the Three Kingdoms is inconsistent in stating whether she, or Liu Shan's mother Lady Gan, was buried with Liu Bei.

See also
 Shu Han family trees
 Lists of people of the Three Kingdoms

Notes

References

 Chen, Shou (3rd century). Records of the Three Kingdoms (Sanguozhi).
 Sima, Guang (1084). Zizhi Tongjian.

|-

245 deaths
Shu Han empresses
Year of birth unknown
Family of Liu Bei
People from Kaifeng
2nd-century births